The Admiral Ushakov class were coastal defense battleships built for the Imperial Russian Navy during the 1890s to counter armored ships of the Swedish Navy. All three ships were stationed in the Baltic Sea when the Russo-Japanese war began and sailed with the Baltic Fleet around the Cape of Good Hope to the Pacific. Two ships were captured by the Japanese and one was scuttled during the Battle of Tsushima.

Design

General characteristics
They displaced .

Propulsion
The Admiral Ushakovs used vertical triple expansion steam engines that produced .

Armament
Their secondary armament consisted of four  guns mounted in casemates at the corners of the superstructure.

Armor
The turrets and the conning tower had  of armour. Harvey armour was used throughout.

Construction

In service

Russo-Japanese War
The three Admiral Ushakovs were assigned to the 3rd Pacific Squadron, under the command of Rear-Admiral Nikolai Nebogatov, and sailed on 2 February 1905 to reinforce Admiral Zinovy Rozhestvensky's 2nd Pacific Squadron en route to the Pacific. They left the Baltic Sea and sailed around Europe, through the length of the Mediterranean Sea, through the Suez Canal, across the Indian Ocean, into the South China Sea where they rendezvoused at Van Fong in French Indochina on 26 April. They departed the anchorage on 1 May and encountered the Japanese fleet on 14 May at what would be called the Battle of Tsushima.

For most of the first part of the battle Nebogatov's ships trailed the more powerful 2nd Squadron and were largely ignored by the Japanese so his ships were in good shape when night fell. Admiral Siniavin had not been hit at all, although Admiral Ushakov had had her bow smashed. He had ordered his ships to turn north to make for Vladivostok earlier in the day, after Admiral Rozhestvensky had been wounded, but he ordered a turn to the southwest to evade Japanese torpedo boats during the evening, but turned north during the night. Admiral Ushakov could not make the required speed to keep up and fell out. She was either sunk or scuttled by her crew during the following morning. Admiral Seniavin and General Admiral Graf Apraksin remained with him and surrendered the following morning when he was spotted by the Japanese fleet.

Notes

Bibliography

External links
 individual ship histories 

Battleships of Russia
Ships of the Imperial Russian Navy